Dorothy Hyson, Lady Quayle (born Dorothy Wardell Heisen; December 24, 1914May 23, 1996) was an American-born film and stage actress who worked largely in England. During World War II, she worked as a cryptographer  at Bletchley Park.

Early life
She was the only child of actress Dorothy Dickson and matinée idol Carl Constantine Hyson (né Heisen). 
Her mother was known for being the Toast of Broadway. Hyson made her acting debut at age three, playing her mother's daughter in a silent film shot by director George Fitzmaurice shot at New York's Paramount studios. Hyson moved to England with her parents who eventually divorced. Her mother had a successful run in Jerome Kern's musical Sally and became the highest-paid actress in London. Hyson was schooled in England and France, but "Little Dot", as she was nicknamed, made several West End appearances in children's roles including J.M. Barrie's Quality Street. After seeing her, aged 13, in the theatrical adaptation of Daisy Ashford's The Young Visiters, Sybil Thorndike told her mother, "She's going to be a star."

Career

After finishing school in Paris, Hyson appeared in Soldiers of the King with Cicely Courtneidge at age 19. Her professional theatrical debut was in Ivor Novello's play Flies in the Sun. She worked on films during the daytime and appeared on stage at night. Filming at Blackpool with Gracie Fields Sing As We Go and acting in the West End in Dodie Smiths Touch Wood led to a nervous breakdown. She continued to be in light West End comedies and had a big hit in an adaptation of Jane Austen's Pride and Prejudice in 1936. In 1938 she appeared as Titania in Tyrone Guthrie's Old Vic revival of A Midsummer Night's Dream.

During the Second World War, Hyson made several more films including You Will Remember with Robert Morley and the musical comedy Spare a Copper with George Formby. She also acted in revue, musical comedy and plays like the thriller Pink String and Sealing Wax in 1943 and an adaptation from Trollope Scandal at Barchester in 1944. In 1945 she played Lady Windermere in Oscar Wilde's Lady Windermere's Fan.

She worked at the secret codebreaking establishment Bletchley Park during World War II, She was part of a team of twelve led by Patricia Bartley who broke the German diplomatic code, Floradora.

Although married to Robert Douglas, she was visited at Bletchley Park by Anthony Quayle, who became her second husband. Quayle recalled that: "She had gone to work as a cryptographer at Bletchley Park. I went to see her there and found her ill and exhausted with the long night shifts."

She was a "byword for theatrical West End glamour" and after the war returned to the West End, joining John Gielgud’s Haymarket Company in 1945.       
                              
She was married twice—to actor Robert Douglas (1935–45) and then actor and director Sir Anthony Quayle (1947–89, his death). After marrying Quayle in 1947 she soon retired from the stage to concentrate on bringing up their three children.

Death
She was widowed in 1989 and died from a stroke on May 23, 1996, aged 81, in Britain, a year after the death of her mother, who died at age 102.

It is not known whether she or her mother ever relinquished their United States citizenship and/or became British citizens.

Filmography
             
Money Mad (aka Paying the Piper, 1918)
The Ghoul (Betty Harlon) (1933)
Soldiers of the King (Judy Marvello) (1933)
Turkey Time (Rose Adair) (1933)
Happy (Lillian) (1933)
That's a Good Girl (Moya Malone) (1934)
Sing As We Go (Phyllis) (1934)
A Cup of Kindness (Betty Ramsbotham)(1934)
Now You're Talking (Mrs. Hamton) (1940)
Spare a Copper (Jane Gray) (1941) 
You Will Remember (Ellaline Terriss) (1941)
Salute to Show Business (1957) (Participant)

Stage

Quality Street - 1927
The Young Visitor - 1928
Flies in the Sun - 1932
Saturday's Children - 1933
That's a Good Girl - 1933
Turkey Time (with Tom Walls & Ralph Lynn) - 1933
Touch Wood (with Flora Robson) - 1934
The Ringmaster (with Laurence Olivier) 1934
Most of the Game - 1935
Pride and Prejudice (with Celia Johnson) - 1936
A Midsummer Night's Dream - 1939
Pink String and Sealing Wax - 1945
Scandal at Barchester - 1944
Lady Windermere's Fan - 1944

References

External links

 1921 passport photo of Dorothy Hyson as a child, travelling to join her parents Dorothy Dickson and Carl Hyson

American film actresses
American stage actresses
American expatriate actresses in the United Kingdom
Bletchley Park people
Actresses from Chicago
1914 births
1996 deaths
20th-century American actresses
20th-century American singers
Bletchley Park women
Wives of knights